Dorond may refer to:
 Dorond, Ardakan
 Dorond, Behabad